Events from the year 1719 in art.

Events
 Jean-Baptiste Oudry becomes a member of the Académie Royale de Peinture et de Sculpture.

Works

 Davies brothers of Wrexham – Chirk Castle gates (wrought iron)
 Antoine Watteau – Pierrot

Births
 February 6 – Alberto Pullicino, Maltese painter (died 1759)
 February 27 – Alejandro González Velázquez, Spanish late-Baroque architect and painter (died 1772)
 May 29 – Lorenzo De Caro, Neapolitan painter (died 1777)
 August 25 – Charles-Amédée-Philippe van Loo, French painter (died 1795)
 September 16 – Étienne Ficquet, French engraver (died 1794)
 October 13 – Josef Ignaz Mildorfer, Austrian painter (died 1775)
 date unknown
 Dominic Serres, French-born painter of naval maritime scenes (died 1793)
 Angelica Le Gru Perotti, Italian painter of the Rococo (died 1776)
 Liu Yong, Chinese politician and calligrapher in the Qing Dynasty (died 1804)

Deaths
 May 3 – Pierre Le Gros the Younger, French sculptor, active in Baroque Rome (born 1666)
 May 7 – Sebastiano Bombelli, Italian Baroque painter, mainly in Venice (born 1635)
 July 22 – Giovanni Gioseffo dal Sole, Italian landscape painter and engraver from Bologna (born 1654)
 August 8 – Christoph Ludwig Agricola, German painter (born 1667)
 September – Jan Weenix, Dutch painter (born 1642)
 September 6 – Carlo Cignani, Italian painter of the Bolognese school (born 1628)
 October 14 – Arnold Houbraken, Dutch painter and writer from Dordrecht (born 1660)
 October 15 – Jan Mortel, Dutch painter (born 1650)
 November 2 – Georg Johann Mattarnovi, German sculptor and architect active in St Petersburg (date of birth unknown)
 November 19 – Hendrick van Streeck, Dutch Golden Age painter of church interiors (born 1659)
 date unknown
 Jan Baptist Brueghel, Flemish Baroque flower painter (born 1647)
 José García Hidalgo, Spanish Baroque painter (born 1646)
 Johann Ulrich Kraus, German illustrator, engraver and publisher (born 1655)
 Arnold Frans Rubens, Flemish Baroque painter specialized in cabinet pictures of landscapes and battle scenes (born 1687)
 Giuseppe Antonio Torricelli, Italian sculptor and gem-engraver of the late Baroque, active in Florence (born 1662)

 
Years of the 18th century in art
1710s in art